Royal Air Force East Moor or RAF East Moor is a former Royal Air Force satellite station located  north of York, North Yorkshire and  south-east of Easingwold, North Yorkshire, England.

The airfield was initially controlled by the Royal Air Force until the site was transferred to the Royal Canadian Air Force in 1942 before being handed back in November 1945.

History

East Moor was opened in 1942 and was originally a 4 Group facility and first hosted No. 158 Squadron RAF which moved from RAF Driffield on 6 June 1942. The squadron flew the Handley Page Halifax Mk. II with detachments at RAF Beaulieu and RAF Manston before moving to RAF Rufforth on 6 November 1942.

Royal Canadian Air Force use

The first squadron was No. 429 Squadron RCAF which formed at the airfield on 7 November 1942 initially only flying the Vickers Wellington Mk.III until January 1943 when the Wellington Mk. X was added. The squadron left on 13 August 1943 going to RAF Leeming where the unit re-equipped with Halifaxes. On 19 September 1943 the next squadron arrived being 432 Squadron which initially used the Avro Lancaster Mk.II before being re-equipped with the Halifax Mk. III in February 1944 and the Mk. VII Halifax in July 1944. The squadron disbanded on 15 May 1945 at the airfield.

The last Canadian squadron to use the airfield was 415 Squadron which flew the Halifax III from 26 July 1944. The unit inherited the additional Mk.VII versions during March 1945 but disbanded shortly after on 15 May 1945 at the airfield.

Royal Air Force use

Not long after the last Canadian squadron disbanded the airfield was handed back to the Royal Air Force (RAF). The first RAF unit to use the airfield was No. 54 Operational Training Unit (OTU) which had moved in during November 1945 flying the de Havilland Mosquito. By May 1946 No. 288 Squadron RAF joined with their Supermarine Spitfire IX's and their Vultee Vengeance Mk. IV's with a detachment at RAF Acklington. The squadron disbanded on 15 June 1946. No. 54 OTU stayed until June 1946 when the unit moved to RAF Leeming but a detachment stayed until 15 November 1946.

Units and aircraft

Current use
The airfield closed to flying in November 1946. Most of the buildings were taken down and the land has reverted largely to agricultural use.

References

Citations

Bibliography

External links
 Airfield Information Exchange
 Atlantik Wall – RAF East Moor – Map

Royal Air Force stations in Yorkshire
History of North Yorkshire
Royal Air Force stations of World War II in the United Kingdom